Ivan Pilný (born July 6, 1944) is a Czech politician and former Microsoft executive who briefly served as Finance Minister of the Czech Republic from 24 May 2017 to 13 December 2017. From 2013 to 2017 Pilný was a member of the Chamber of Deputies (MP).

References 

1944 births
ANO 2011 Government ministers
ANO 2011 MPs
Businesspeople from Prague
Finance ministers of the Czech Republic
Living people
Politicians from Prague
Czech Technical University in Prague alumni
Members of the Chamber of Deputies of the Czech Republic (2013–2017)